The Australian cricket team toured New Zealand in the 1981-82 season to play three-match One Day International and Test series against New Zealand. The first ODI was won by New Zealand before a record 42,000 fans, but Australia won the series 2-1. The Test series was drawn 1-1, with the first Test washed out.

Australian squad
The original squad selected was as follows:
Batsmen - Greg Chappell (captain), Kim Hughes, Graeme Wood, Allan Border, John Dyson, Bruce Laird
Fastbowlers - Dennis Lillee, Terry Alderman, Len Pascoe, Jeff Thomson
Spinners - Ray Bright, Bruce Yardley
Wicketkeepers - Rod Marsh

One Day Internationals (ODIs)

Australia won the Rothmans Cup 2-1.

1st ODI

2nd ODI

3rd ODI

Test series summary

First Test

Second Test

Third Test

References

Further reading

External links

Australia in New Zealand 1981-82 at ESPN Cricinfo

1982 in Australian cricket
1981-82
1982 in New Zealand cricket
International cricket competitions from 1980–81 to 1985
New Zealand cricket seasons from 1970–71 to 1999–2000